Julia Hardy is a non-binary British television presenter known for their interests in gaming, music, ESports and new technology. They are the creator and presenter of the online fitness programme Game To Train. In addition to their professional work, they are a Twitch streamer and a YouTuber.

Career
She began her career in 2005 when she was chosen to be a founding presenter of the British television channel Rockworld TV. On Rockworld TV, she co-presented Rockjaw and went on to become a field reporter, covering music events such as Maschinenfest, Download Festival and the Reading and Leeds Festivals.

In 2008, she became a presenter on Current TV show The Countdown, and in 2009 joined Ginx TV as presenter of GameFace and Ginx Files which were shown on Bravo and later Challenge. Also in 2009, she launched an online television show called AE:On.

She also presented GameFace's successor The Blurb for Ginx TV on Challenge in 2011.

In 2015, she started hosting a show on the internet radio station, TotalRock. She was also a presenter for MineCon 2015.

As well as presenting, she also contributes articles to magazines and newspapers such as GamesMaster, Tuned, Big Cheese and the Sunday Telegraph.

In 2016 she became BBC Radio 1's gaming presenter where she makes a monthly gaming show for BBC iPlayer and features on other radio shows talking about video games.

In 2016 Hardy gave a TEDx talk about sexism, misogyny, and online trolls. This related to her blog Misogyny Monday.

In 2017 she hosted an AOL original series called Tech Hunters, looking at retro and nostalgic technology.

In November 2017, she hosted Minecon Earth's Post and Pre-show which was an online stream broadcast around the world based on the game, Minecraft.

In October 2019, she hosted Runefest, a convention for fans of the game RuneScape.

In 2020, she joint hosted the This Game Changed My Life podcast series on the BBC with Aoife Wilson. This series has been nominated for an award in the Best New Show category of the 2021 Audio and Radio Industry Awards.

On 25 April 2022, she hosted the Gayming Awards 2022 at Troxy in London.

Game To Train 

In 2020, she created the free online exercise programme Game To Train. The exercise programme is based around routines inspired by characters from well known computer games.

Personal life 
Julia is non-binary and uses she/they pronouns.

References

External links
 Official Julia Hardy Facebook
 Official Julia Hardy Instagram
 Official Game To Train Instagram

Living people
English television presenters
People from Harrow, London
Year of birth missing (living people)